Charles William Ramsden (11 June 1904 – 16 February 1975) was an English footballer. His regular position was as a forward. He was born in Bucklow, Cheshire. He played for Rotherham Town, Stockport County, Manchester North End, and Manchester United.

External links
MUFCInfo.com profile

1904 births
1975 deaths
English footballers
Manchester United F.C. players
Stockport County F.C. players
Manchester North End F.C. players
Association football forwards